Epako Women's Center is a Community Empowerment Center constructed by the Ministry of Gender Equality and Child Welfare.

Epako Women's Centre comprises offices, a community hall, training workshop rooms, a waiting room, a kitchen and ablutions facilities. These facilities can be rented out at minimal rates. The purpose of the center is to serve as a coordination hub for various activities with the potential to help rural and under-served urban communities advance on the socio economic ladder. The centre serves as a venue for training community members in skills development, community meetings and information sharing, exhibiting and marketing products made by community members, and awareness-raising events for issues such as Gender-Based Violence (GBV) and child care and protection.

History 
Epako Women's Center was constructed in 2011 and became functional in 2012.

It was officially inaugurated by former Minister of Gender Equality and Child Welfare, late Honourable Rosalia Nghidinwa (MP), Omaheke Region of Namibia.

Projects 
Skills development trainings include needlework and tailoring, bead work, leather work and basic business management.

References

External links 

 Official website

Women's organisations based in Namibia